Dalane is a neighbourhood in the city of Kristiansand in Agder county, Norway. It is located in the borough of Grim and in the district of Grim. The neighborhood lies along the Norwegian National Road 9, north of Tinnheia and Krossen and south of Strai.

References

Geography of Kristiansand
Neighbourhoods of Kristiansand